Two versions of Medusa were created by Michelangelo Merisi da Caravaggio – one in 1596 and the other in 1597 – depicting the exact moment she was executed by Perseus. He plays with the concept by replacing Medusa's face with his own, as an indication of his immunity to her dreadful gaze. Due to its bizarre and intricate design, the painting is said to complement Caravaggio's unique fascination with violence and realism. It was commissioned by Italian diplomat Francesco Maria del Monte as a means of giving it to the Grand Duke of Tuscany, and is now located in the Uffizi Museum in Florence without signature.

History 
In the 1590s Caravaggio had just started becoming a successful and wealthy artist in Rome. However, the time in which he painted the two versions of the Medusa were characterized by several run-ins with the law.  In July 1597, Caravaggio and his partner Prospero Orsi became involved as witnesses in a crime that occurred near San Luigi de' Francesi. In one instance, a barber named Luca gave a testimony about Caravaggio where he provided a description regarding his mysterious attire:  "This painter is a stocky young man…with a thin black beard, thick eyebrows and black eyes, who goes dressed all in black, in a rather disorderly fashion, wearing black hose that is a little bit threadbare, and who has a thick head of hair, long over his forehead." At the time, there was an unsolved case in which two items were reported as being missing – a dark cloak and a small dagger. As a result of his mysterious behavior and also due to his affiliation with cloaks, Caravaggio was arrested several times in which he indicated that he favored dressing in dark attire to avoid being seen by the public, which is also why he preferred to make late night trips to evade excessive or unnecessary attention. On May 4, 1598, he was arrested again for possessing a sword in public, in which he asserted:   “I was arrested last night…because I was carrying a sword. I carry the sword by right because I am Painter to Cardinal del Monte. I am in his service and live in his house. I am entered on his household payroll.”   
Caravaggio's paintings were never in tune with the idealized themes that were prevalent during the time period. Instead, he became more intrigued with the idea of realism and incorporated it into his paintings such as Boy with a Basket of Fruit, The Fortune Teller, The Cardsharps, Bacchus, and even The Musicians, which were all painted within the same time period. When he painted Medusa, Caravaggio hit a great milestone in his life - he was given a chance to decorate the Contarelli Chapel, in which he created realistic images regarding the life of St. Matthew himself. Some of these paintings include Saint Matthew and the Angel, The Martyrdom of Saint Matthew, and The Calling of Saint Matthew. This opportunity to paint the chapel gave him great advantage and a sense of motivation to incorporate more realism in his artworks.

Versions
The first version of the painting created in 1596 is known as Murtula, named after poet Gaspare Murtola, who wrote "flee, for if your eyes are petrified in amazement, she will turn you to stone." It measures 48 by 55 cm in length and is signed Michel A F, indicating "Michel Angelo made [this]", with Michelangelo being Caravaggio's first name after all. This work is privately owned.

The second version of the painting created in 1597 is known as Medusa (Italian: Testa di Medusa). It is slightly bigger than the first, measuring 60×55 cm in length and although it's not signed, it is often dated with the year 1597. This work is held in the Uffizi Museum located in Florence.

Subject matter 
For its subject matter, Caravaggio drew on the myth of Medusa. The painting depicts the severed head of Medusa, a monster described as a woman with bronze hands and golden wings who had countless venomous snakes on her head in place of her own hair. Anyone who even so much as glanced at her would be turned to stone. Medusa, along with her two sisters Stheno and Euryale, was known as a Gorgon, a powerful mythical creature in ancient Greek mythology. She was cursed by the Roman goddess Minerva (or the Greek goddess Athena), who turned her into the venomous monster she was. Perseus, son of Greek god Zeus and princess Danae, decapitated Medusa using a shield given by Athena.

In his painting, Caravaggio depicts a self-portrait of his own face in the place of Medusa's, as a way of indicating his immunity to her dreadful gaze. Though the head is decapitated, it still appears conscious as the painting captures its final moments in silence before being atrociously defeated. Blood pours down in many streaks, while the mouth hangs wide open baring teeth. With brows creased and eyes amplified, an appalling expression is portrayed.

The painting was commissioned as a commemoration shield by Cardinal Francesco Maria Del Monte, who wanted to give it to the Grand Duke of Tuscany, Ferdinando I de' Medici, for his courage, and have it placed in the Medici collection.

Description

Material 
The chemical composition of this painting is extremely complex. Caravaggio used a circular shield made from poplar wood as a base for this painting. The shield was covered by linen, on which four different layers of paint - known as preparation layers - were added to help create the basis for the painting. On top of the preparation layers, an additional layer was applied to make the background appear more reflective. On top of this reflective layer, another layer was applied (the green background that is shown on the painting) - this layer consists of a mixture of verdigris and lead-tin yellow paint. On top of this background layer, three more layers consisting of mixtures of siccative oils, turpentine and mastic with traces of beeswax were applied to form the painting. At last, a few more layers were added to help conserve the painting.

Style 
The level of tenebrism and realism are well portrayed in this painting – creating a three-dimensional appearance. Medusa's cheeks and jawline are elongated to complement the nature of the painting. Caravaggio's idea of using a convex shield as a canvas was to paint it from Perseus' point of view – in the instance Medusa's reflection appeared on his shield, right before he killed her.

Influence 
The idea of decapitation is a very frequent image portrayed by Caravaggio and it tends to occur in many of his artworks such as Judith Beheading Holofernes, David with the Head of Goliath, and The Beheading of St John the Baptist.

Caravaggio's artwork is portrayed as being a visual instrument through the depiction of scenes related to torture and martyrdom. Every artist paints themselves in their own works of art. That being said, Caravaggio's dark and mysterious nature is evident and demonstrated in his paintings. The combination of violence and realism is what makes his work unique.

See also
List of paintings by Caravaggio

Sources 
 
 Graham-Dixon, Andrew. “Caravaggio.” Encyclopædia Britannica, Encyclopædia Britannica, Inc., 4 February 2019. 
“Medusa: The Real Story of the Snake-Haired Gorgon.” Greek Mythology.

"Perseus: Greek Mythology." Encyclopædia Britannica, 14 February 2019.
Jones, Jonathan. "Medusa, Caravaggio (c 1598)." The Guardian, 25 Jan, 2003.

References

External links
Medusa at Web Gallery of Art

1597 paintings
Cultural depictions of Medusa
Mythological paintings by Caravaggio
Paintings in the collection of the Uffizi
Paintings depicting Greek myths
Snakes in art